Parliamentary elections will be held in Serbia by 30 April 2026 to elect members of the National Assembly.

The Serbian Progressive Party (SNS) came to power after the 2012 election when it formed a coalition government with the Socialist Party of Serbia (SPS). In the 2022 parliamentary election, SNS lost its supermajority of seats while opposition parties returned to the National Assembly. The United for the Victory of Serbia (UZPS) coalition, which placed second in the 2022 election, was dissolved shortly afterwards. Ana Brnabić, who has been the prime minister since 2017, and her third cabinet were inaugurated on 26 October 2022.

Background 
A populist coalition led by the Serbian Progressive Party (SNS) came to power after the 2012 election, along with the Socialist Party of Serbia (SPS). Aleksandar Vučić, who initially served as deputy prime minister and later as prime minister, was elected president in 2017 and re-elected in 2022. Since he came to power, observers have assessed that Serbia has suffered from democratic backsliding into authoritarianism, followed by a decline in media freedom and civil liberties. In 2021, the V-Dem Institute categorised Serbia as an electoral autocracy and stated that the standards of judiciary and electoral integrity had declined in the past ten years.

Environmental protests were held in Serbia in 2021 and early 2022, while its climax reached in November and December 2021. A constitutional referendum was also held in January 2022, in which the voters decided on changing the Constitution in the part related to the judiciary. A majority of voters voted in favour of changes, although only 30% of the voters turned out to vote. In the 2022 general election, the Together We Can Do Everything coalition, led by SNS, lost its parliamentary majority, although the election also oversaw twelve ballot lists in total that crossed the 3% threshold. Non-governmental organisations reported that electoral irregularities occurred during the voting day. Following the election, the United for the Victory of Serbia (UZPS) coalition, which placed second, was dissolved. Ana Brnabić, who has been the prime minister since 2017, and her cabinet were sworn in on 26 October 2022. In March 2023, Vučić announced the formation of the People's Movement for the State.

Electoral system 
The 250 members of the National Assembly are elected by closed-list proportional representation from a single nationwide constituency. Seats are allocated using the d'Hondt method with an electoral threshold of 3% of all votes cast, although the threshold is waived for ethnic minority parties. Minority ballots need at least 5,000 signatories to qualify on ballot while non-minority ballots need 10,000. As of 2020, 40% of the candidates on the electoral lists must be female. According to law, the parliamentary election is supposed to take place by 30 April 2026.

Political parties 

The table below lists political parties and coalitions elected in the National Assembly after the 2022 parliamentary election.

Current composition

Parties and coalitions 
After the 2022 parliamentary election, Aleksandar Jovanović Ćuta, Biljana Stojković, and Nebojša Zelenović, who were representatives of the We Must coalition, formed a joint political party named Together, in June 2022. Political Platform "Solidarity", which was also affiliated with the We Must coalition, merged into Together in January 2023. The Party of Freedom and Justice, Movement of Free Citizens, Movement for Reversal, and United Trade Unions of Serbia "Sloga", who were apart of the UZPS coalition, formed the Ujedinjeni parliamentary group in the National Assembly in August 2022.

Opinion polls

References 

Serbia
Next